Dunfermline in Fife was a royal burgh that returned one commissioner to the Parliament of Scotland and to the Convention of Estates.

After the Acts of Union 1707, Dunfermline, Culross, Inverkeithing, Queensferry and Stirling formed the Stirling district of burghs, returning one member between them to the House of Commons of Great Britain.

List of burgh commissioners

 1661–63: James Mudie, bailie 
 1665 convention, 1667 convention, 1669–1774: Peter Walker, provost 
 1678 convention: John Anderson, merchant, bailie 
 1681–82: Andrew Belfrage, bailie 
 1685–86: Sir Patrick Murray 
 1689 convention, 1689–97: Sir Charles Halkett of Pitfirrane (died 1697) 
 1697: Sir Patrick Aikenhead (died c.1698)
 1699–1701: Jomes Hamiltoun 
 1702–05: Sir James Halkett of Pitfirrane (died 1705) 
 1705–07: Sir Peter Halkett of Pitfirrane

References

See also
 List of constituencies in the Parliament of Scotland at the time of the Union

Constituencies of the Parliament of Scotland (to 1707)
Politics of Dunfermline
History of Fife
Constituencies disestablished in 1707
1707 disestablishments in Scotland
Dunfermline